The Battle of Life: A Love Story is an 1846 novel by Charles Dickens. It is the fourth of his five "Christmas Books", coming after The Cricket on the Hearth and followed by The Haunted Man and the Ghost's Bargain.

The setting is an English village that stands on the site of an historic battle. Some characters refer to the battle as a metaphor for the struggles of life, hence the title.

Battle is the only one of the five Christmas Books that has no supernatural or explicitly religious elements. (One scene takes place at Christmas time, but it is not the final scene.) The story bears some resemblance to The Cricket on the Hearth in two respects: it has a non-urban setting, and it is resolved with a romantic twist. It is even less of a social novel than is Cricket. As is typical with Dickens, the ending is a happy one.

It is one of Dickens's lesser-known works and has never attained any high level of popularity – a trait it shares with The Haunted Man, in contrast to the other of his Christmas Books.

Plot summary

Two sisters, Grace and Marion, live happily in an English village with their two servants, Clemency Newcome and Ben Britain, and their good-natured widower father Dr Jeddler. Dr Jeddler is a man whose philosophy is to treat life as a farce. Marion, the younger sister, is betrothed to Alfred Heathfield, Jeddler's ward who is leaving the village to complete his studies. He entrusts Marion to Grace's care and makes a promise to return to win Marion's hand.

Michael Warden, a libertine who is about to leave the country, is thought by the solicitors Snitchey and Craggs to be about to seduce the younger sister into an elopement. Clemency spies Marion one night in her clandestine rendezvous with Warden. On the day that Alfred is to return, however, it is discovered that Marion has run off. Her supposed elopement causes much grief to both her father and her sister.

Six years pass. Clemency is now married to Britain and the two have set up a tavern in the village. After nursing heartbreak, Alfred marries Grace instead of Marion and she bears him a daughter, also called Marion. On the birthday of Marion, Grace confides to Alfred that Marion has made a promise to explain her so-called "elopement" in person. Marion indeed appears that evening by sunset and explains her disappearance to the parties involved. It turns out that Marion has not "eloped" but has instead been living at her aunt Martha's place so as to allow Alfred to fall in love with Grace. Tears are shed and happiness and forgiveness reign as the missing sister is reunited with the rest. Warden also returns, and, forgiven by Dr Jeddler, marries Marion.

Stage adaptation
An adaptation of The Battle of Life by Albert Richard Smith was produced with success at the Surrey Theatre in 1846.

External links

The Battle of Life at Internet Archive.

 
The Battle of Life - Searchable HTML version.
The Battle of Life - Easy to read HTML version.

1846 British novels
British novels adapted into plays
Christmas novels
English novels
Novels by Charles Dickens